Jørgen Grave (28 March 1909 – 21 January 1988) was a Norwegian politician for the Christian Democratic Party.

He was born in Drangedal.

He was elected to the Norwegian Parliament from Telemark in 1954, and was re-elected on one occasion.

On the local level Grave was a member of Drangedal municipal council from 1947 to 1957.

Outside politics Grave worked as a secretary in Det norske lutherske Indremisjonsselskap. He also worked in Vårt Land.

References

1909 births
1988 deaths
People from Drangedal
Christian Democratic Party (Norway) politicians
Members of the Storting
Politicians from Telemark
Norwegian Lutherans
20th-century Norwegian politicians
20th-century Lutherans